Las Breas Airport is an airport  south-southeast of Taltal, a Pacific coastal town in the Antofagasta Region of Chile.

There is a  unpaved overrun on the north end of the runway.

See also

Transport in Chile
List of airports in Chile

References

External links
Las Breas Airport at OpenStreetMap
Las Breas Airport at OurAirports

Airports in Antofagasta Region